Artikelly is a small village and townland in County Londonderry, Northern Ireland. In the 2001 Census it had a population of 360 people. It is 1 km north east of Limavady and adjoins the major industrial area at Aghanloo. It is situated within Causeway Coast and Glens district.

History 
They made their ‘capital’ at Ballycastle or Ballycaslan, near Aghanloo, and a second settlement at Artikelly. Artikelly was the largest hamlet in the former Limavady Borough Council area, with a population of 360 in 2001.

People
William Porter (1805-1880) was born in Artikelly. He was called to the Bar in 1831, and in 1839 was appointed Attorney General at the Cape. He was offered a knighthood and Premiership of the Cape, both of which he declined. He endowed a university there and was its first chancellor. In 1873 he returned to Ireland. He died in Belfast.

See also 
List of villages in Northern Ireland

References 

Villages in County Londonderry
Causeway Coast and Glens district